The rivalry between Panathinaikos and PAOK is the football rivalry between two of the most popular teams of the two biggest cities in Greece, the capital of Athens and Thessaloniki. In general terms, there is mutual respect between the two clubs and the rivalry has been focused mainly on the pitch throughout the decades. The Panathinaikos vs PAOK match is the most-played in Greek Alpha Ethniki/Superleague history (1959–present) at 146 games (end of 2021–22 season).

Statistics

Head-to-head

Matches list

Panhellenic Championship (1927 — 1959)

1 PAOK were awarded a 2–0 walkover.

Alpha Ethniki / Super League Greece (1959 — present)

1 PAOK were awarded a 0–2 walkover.

2 Match suspended at 77th minute.

3 Match suspended at 55th minute (score: 1–0). PAOK were awarded a 0–3 win.

Greek Cup

* Match suspended at 115th minute.

• Series won: Panathinaikos 10, PAOK 8.

Greek League Cup

References

Greece football derbies
Panathinaikos F.C.
PAOK